Johannes Thesselius (Erfurt  1590Szeben, 1643) was a German-Transylvanian composer of church and dance music. He came from Vienna in 1625 to be kapellmeister to Gabriel Bethlen.

References

Austrian classical composers
Austrian Baroque composers
1590s births
1643 deaths
17th-century classical composers
Austrian male classical composers
17th-century male musicians